Number 13 Squadron, also written as XIII Squadron, is a squadron of the Royal Air Force which operate the General Atomics MQ-9A Reaper unmanned aerial vehicle from RAF Waddington since reforming on 26 October 2012.  The unit first formed as part of the Royal Flying Corps on 10 January 1915 and went on to fly the Martinsyde G.100, the Royal Aircraft Factory F.E.2, the SPAD VII and SPAD XIII, the Sopwith Dolphin during the First World War.  In Second World War it started out operating the Westland Lysander for army cooperation. From late  1942 it used Blenheims in North Africa but in 1943 squadron converted to Ventura for coastal patrols and convoy escort duties.  Post war it operated Mosquito before transitioning to the new jet aircraft Gloster Meteor and English Electric Canberra for photoreconnaissance.  From 1 January 1990, it operated the Panavia Tornado, initially the GR1A at RAF Honington and later the GR4/4A at RAF Marham where it temporarily disbanded on 13 May 2011.

History

World War I
No. XIII Squadron RFC was formed at RAF Gosport, Hampshire, on 10 January 1915 and moved to France and the Western Front on 19 October 1915, initially on Army co-operation duties and subsequently on bombing raids, pioneering formation bombing. Aircraft types operated during the war included the Martinsyde G.100, the Royal Aircraft Factory F.E.2, the Royal Aircraft Factory R.E.8, the SPAD VII and SPAD XIII, and the Sopwith Dolphin fighters. The squadron disbanded on 31 December 1919.

World War II
The unit had reformed at RAF Kenley on 1 April 1924 and inter-war years saw the squadron operate from various UK bases equipped with a variety of aircraft types including the Bristol F.2, Armstrong Whitworth Atlas, Hawker Audax and Hawker Hector for army cooperation. By January 1939 the squadron was equipped with Westland Lysanders and moved to France on 2 October until late May 1940 when it withdrew to UK bases following the Fall of France.

In May 1941 No. XIII Squadron changed role and theatre, flying a variety of bomber aircraft including the Bristol Blenheim and Douglas Boston light bombers in the Mediterranean until the end of the war, disbanding on 19 April 1946.

Cold War (1946–1982)

No. XIII Squadron reformed as No. 13 (Photographic Reconnaissance) Squadron on 1 September 1946 at RAF Ein Shemer, Palestine, when No. 680 Squadron was renumbered. Peace heralded the return to reconnaissance duties, with the unit flying the de Havilland Mosquito PR.34. Moving to Egypt, the squadron converted to the Gloster Meteor PR.10 in 1952 and by 1956 was operating the English Electric Canberra PR.7.

During the 1956 Suez Crisis, the squadron flew reconnaissance flights over Syria from Cyprus, which resulted in one Canberra being shot down by the Syrian Air Force.

In 1978, the squadron moved to RAF Wyton near Huntingdon in the UK, flying Canberra PR.7 and PR.9s, built by Short Brothers, until the unit disbanded on 1 January 1982.

Panavia Tornado (1990–2011)

RAF Honington & Gulf War (1990–1994)
The squadron reformed at RAF Honington on 1 January 1990 equipped with reconnaissance Tornado GR.1A aircraft. These aircraft were equipped with the new and somewhat embryonic reconnaissance equipment designed to exploit the night, all-weather capability of the Tornado by using a unique system of infra-red sensors and video recorders. The complete system is carried and allows the Navigator to either view the imagery in real time or later in the mission. As the Allied Coalition began to deploy forces to the Gulf in the latter part of 1990, it quickly became apparent that the unique night reconnaissance capability of the Tornado GR.1A could provide vital intelligence to the Allied commanders. As a result, on 15/16 January 1991, immediately before hostilities commenced, 6 aircraft were deployed to Saudi Arabia. During the first nights of the War, the Reconnaissance Wing successfully discovered several of the elusive Scud sites.

The majority of sorties were however, tasked into Central and Eastern Iraq to identify the disposition of the various Iraqi ground forces in preparation for the ground offensive. Although the rest of the Coalition Air Forces moved to medium level operations after the first few nights of the air war, the GR.1As operated at night and at low-level for the duration of the conflict. The Squadron was also fundamental to the success of the Tornado/TIALD (Thermal Imaging And Laser Designation) combination. 4 XIII Squadron crews began the work-up from mid-January and, after encouraging results, four aircraft flew to Tabuk.

After the war, the Squadron continued its peacetime training role at RAF Honington as well as taking part in Operation Jural, the monitoring of a No-Fly Zone in the South of Iraq below the 32nd parallel north.

RAF Marham (1994–2011)

On 1 February 1994, No. XIII Squadron moved to RAF Marham. Since that time, the Squadron has taken part in a number of successful exercises around the world from Yuma in America to Penang, Malaysia. Deployments to operational theatres have continued to be a major feature of the squadron's life having deployed on Operation Warden and Operation Bolton to monitor both the Northern and Southern No-Fly Zones in Iraq. XIII Squadron crews joined the Ali Al Salem Combat Air Wing (Composite RAF Squadron formed from the Tornado GR4 Force for Gulf War 2) in early 2003 and flew Scud Hunting missions in the Western Desert of Iraq during the Iraq War of 2003. The squadron also flew the last sortie by a Tornado in support of Operation Telic in 2009.

In the summer of 2010 the squadron flew Close Air Support in Afghanistan as part of Operation Herrick, and in 2011 they fired Storm Shadow missiles against Libya in the early days of Operation Ellamy.  A few weeks later, on 13 May 2011, the squadron was disbanded as part of the reductions announced in the Strategic Defence and Security Review of 2010.

MQ-9 Reaper (2012–present)
At the disbandment parade of XIII (Tornado) Squadron in May 2011, the Chief of the Air Staff announced the formation of a second unit operating the MQ-9 Reaper RPAS, which would receive the XIII Squadron numberplate. XIII (Reaper) Squadron was reformed on 26 October 2012 at RAF Waddington. Subsequently, the Squadron flew the first remote operational mission from UK soil towards the end of April 2013 and conducted its first remote weapons strike a few days later.

The squadron will re-equip with Protector RG Mk1 when that comes into service around 2024.

Aircraft operated 
List of aircraft operated by No. 13 Squadron:

 Royal Aircraft Factory B.E.2 c, d, and e variants (1915 – 1917)
 Royal Aircraft Factory R.E.8 (1917 – 1919)
 Bristol F.2B Fighter (1924 – 1928)
 Armstrong Whitworth Atlas (1927 – 1932)
 Hawker Audax (1932 – 1937)
 Hawker Hector (1937 – 1939)
 Westland Lysander Mk I, Mk II, Mk III (1939 – 1941)
 Bristol Blenheim Mk IV, Mk V (1941 – 1943)
 Lockheed Ventura (1943 – 1943)
 Martin Baltimore B.IV, B.V (1944 – 1944)
 Douglas Boston Mk IV, Mk V (1944 – 1946)
 de Havilland Mosquito PR.34 (1946 – 1952)
 Gloster Meteor Meteor PR.10 (1952 – 1956)
 English Electric Canberra PR.7, PR.9 (1956 – 1982)
 Panavia Tornado GR1A, GR4A (1990 – 2011)
 General Atomics MQ-9A Reaper (2012 – present)

See also
List of RAF squadrons

Bibliography
 Halley, J.J., The Squadrons of the Royal Air Force & Commonwealth 1918-1988, 1988, Air-Britain (Historians) Ltd,

References

Sources
This article contains information that originally came from a British Government website, and is subject to Crown copyright. The protected material may be reproduced free of charge subject to the material being reproduced accurately and not being used in a derogatory manner or in a misleading context. Where the material is being published or issued to others, the source and copyright status must be acknowledged.

External links

 

Military units and formations established in 1915
013
RAF Marham units
013 squadron
Military units and formations of the Gulf War
1915 establishments in the United Kingdom